The Keltner House, located on Kentucky Route 1913 in Green County near Haskingsville, Kentucky, was listed on the National Register of Historic Places in 1984.

The house was deemed to be "one of the best examples of the stylistic transition between Federal and Greek Revival styles in the county."

The house is no longer at the location.

References

Houses on the National Register of Historic Places in Kentucky
Federal architecture in Kentucky
Houses completed in 1826
National Register of Historic Places in Green County, Kentucky
Former buildings and structures in Kentucky
1826 establishments in Kentucky
Greek Revival architecture in Kentucky
Houses in Green County, Kentucky
Demolished but still listed on the National Register of Historic Places